General elections were held in Azad Kashmir in 1985 to elect the members of third assembly of Azad Kashmir.

References

Elections in Azad Kashmir
1985 elections in Pakistan